Jiří Gruša (10 November 1938, in Pardubice – 28 October 2011, in Bad Oeynhausen) was a Czech poet, novelist, translator, diplomat and politician.

Life and career
Gruša was born in Pardubice, then Czechoslovakia (present-day Czech Republic), and later moved to Prague. He graduated from the Philosophical Faculty of Charles University in Prague. He worked for periodicals Tvář, Sešity and Nové knihy.

He started coming under the scrutiny of the communist regime of then Czechoslovakia in 1969 because of his writings. He was banned from publishing and had to work in a construction cooperative. He took part in distribution of samizdat literature. He was arrested in 1974 for "the crime of initiating disorder" after distributing nineteen copies of his first novel, Dotazník (The Questionnaire) and voicing his intention to have it published in Switzerland. After world-wide protest, he was released after two months. He later became a signatory of the human rights document, Charter 77. In 1981 his citizenship was revoked, and between 1982 and 1990 he lived in the Federal Republic of Germany.

In 1990 conditions in Czechoslovakia became more favorable and he returned to work for the Ministry of Foreign Affairs. From 1991 to 1997, he served as an ambassador to Germany. Later, he joined the minority government of Václav Klaus as a Minister of Education. The government lost support of the opposition parties and President Václav Havel orchestrated establishment of a new caretaker government. Even though Gruša was a non-party minister, he was replaced by Jan Sokol. He served as an ambassador to Austria until 2004. From 2005 to 2009 he was Director of the Diplomatic Academy of Vienna. From 2004 to 2009 he was the President of PEN International.

Gruša participated in standardisation of the term "Tschechien" as the official name of the Czech Republic in German language. See Name of the Czech Republic for overview.

Gruša died at the age of 72 on 28 October 2011 during a heart operation in Germany.  Václav Havel wrote (before his own death a month and a half later on 18 December) that Gruša was "one of a few close people whom I deeply respected and who have left this world recently."

Awards and honors
2007: Chevalier of the Legion of Honor of France
2006: New Culture of New Europe Award
2002: Jaroslav Seifert Prize

Works
English translated
Franz Kafka of Prague, Trans. Eric Mossbacker.
The Questionnaire, Trans. Peter Kussi.

Czech language
Umění stárnout [The Art of Aging]
Gebrauchsanweisung für Tschechien und Prag [Instruction Manual for the Czech Republic and Prague]
Grušas Wacht am Rhein aneb Putovní ghetto [The Watch on the Rhein]

Original in German
Beneš als Österreicher  Wieser Verlag, Klagenfurt 2012

References

External links

 Interview with Jiří Gruša (Festival spisovatelů Praha)
 https://web.archive.org/web/20111003170500/http://www.penclub.at/grusa/ (in German and English)
 PEN International

Czech poets
Czech male poets
Education ministers of the Czech Republic
Czech diplomats
Members of the European Academy of Sciences and Arts
PEN International
Ambassadors of Czechoslovakia to Germany
Ambassadors of the Czech Republic to Germany
Ambassadors of the Czech Republic to Austria
Charter 77 signatories
Writers from Pardubice
1938 births
2011 deaths
Knights Commander of the Order of Merit of the Federal Republic of Germany
Czechoslovak expatriates in Germany
20th-century Czech poets
Civic Democratic Party (Czech Republic) Government ministers
Politicians from Pardubice
Charles University alumni